Christopher Ian Chesser (September 16, 1948 – February 2, 2023) was an American film and television producer. He was known for producing the 1989 film Major League. He died in Los Angeles on February 2, 2023, at the age of 74.

References

External links

1948 births
2023 deaths
American film producers